Shen Qibin (born 1966 in Yixing, Jiangsu, China) is a Chinese artist and art disseminator. He has participated in the foundation of six art platforms, curated and coordinated over 500 exhibitions, and published 200 catalogues in China. He gave 100 speeches all over the world for promoting the development of Chinese contemporary art.

Main exhibitions 

2015  New Chinese Art Invitational Exhibition,Cambridge University,UK
2015  Post-Garden Solo Exhibition,Saatchi Gallery, London,UK
2012  Shen Qibin Contemporary Art Works Exhibition, Diaoyutai State Guesthouse, Beijing, China
2008  Intrude: art and life 366, Shanghai, China
2004  "China, the body everywhere?", Museum of Contemporary Art, Marseilles, France
2003  "Are you familiar?" Contemporary Art Works Exhibition, Nanjing Single Art Center, Nanjing, China
2003  "Reflection" Contemporary Art Exhibition, Kunming Shanghe Chuangku, Nanjing, China
2002  "Daydream "Chinese Contemporary Art Works Exhibition, Nanjing Museum,China
2001  "From the house of artists" Contemporary Art Works Exhibition, Phoenix Museum, Nanjing, China
2000  Origin & Imagery Art Works Exhibition, Nanjing, China
1998  Art Myth----Shen Qibin Contemporary Art Works Exhibition, National Art Museum of China, Beijing, China
1993  "Chinese Oil Painting Biennale", Beijing, China
1993  Art Myth Group Exhibition, Jiangsu Museum, Jiangsu, China
1992  Guangzhou Biennial Exhibition, Guangzhou, China

References

External links
 www.shenqibin.com

1966 births
Living people
Artists from Wuxi
Chinese contemporary artists
Chinese curators
People from Yixing